The Cuyama River (Chumash: Kuyam, meaning "Clam") is a  river in southern San Luis Obispo County, northern Santa Barbara County, and northern Ventura County, in the U.S. state of California. It joins the Sisquoc River forming the Santa Maria River. The river's name comes from an Indian village named for the Chumash word kuyam, meaning "clam" or "freshwater mollusk".

Course

The Cuyama River's source is in San Emigdio Mountains, within the Chumash Wilderness area of the Los Padres National Forest at an altitude above . The river's upper reaches are in Ventura County, where several tributaries join before the mainstem river exits Los Padres National Forest. After leaving the national forest the river enters Santa Barbara County and flows through the  Cuyama Valley, which lies between the Caliente Range and the Sierra Madre Mountains. The river flows past the towns of Cuyama and New Cuyama. Through most of the Cuyama Valley and downriver to its confluence with the Sisquoc River the Cuyama River forms the approximate boundary between Santa Barbara County and San Luis Obispo County.

Downstream from the Cuyama Valley the river enters Twitchell Reservoir, after which it flows another  to its confluence with the Sisquoc River.

The river's course has evolved over its history by fault displacement.

Management
About  from its source the river reaches Twitchell Reservoir, formed by Twitchell Dam. The dam provides flood control and allows water to be released gradually, so that as much of it as possible will seep into the soil and recharge the groundwater aquifer. The water is released as quickly as possible while still allowing it to percolate into the ground, so the reservoir is often empty. The river and the reservoir are usually dry during the summer, when there is little or no rain. However, large flows can occur following winter storms.

See also
 List of rivers of California
 Camp Scheideck in the Cuyama Valley

References

External links
 
 Floods in Cuyama Valley, California, February 1998 , United States Geological Survey
Cuyama Valley Photos, United States Geological Survey

Rivers of Southern California
Cuyama Valley
Rivers of Santa Barbara County, California
Rivers of San Luis Obispo County, California
Rivers of Ventura County, California
Los Padres National Forest
San Emigdio Mountains